Searsia brenanii is a species of plant in the family Anacardiaceae. It is endemic to Tanzania.  It is threatened by habitat loss.

References

Flora of Tanzania
brenanii
Endangered plants
Taxonomy articles created by Polbot